Flora Balzano (born 24 May 1951 in Algiers) is a Québécois writer and comedian, best known for her novel Soigne ta chute, which has been the subject of academic study.  She was a finalist of the 1991 Governor General's Awards for having written the novel Soigne ta chute.  In addition, she had a career in voice acting, with one of her main roles being Martin Prince in the Québec version of The Simpsons.

Writings

Novel

 Soigne ta chute, Montréal, XYZ editor, "Romanichels" collection, 1991. 120 pages.

Short stories

 Quatre nouvelles (1988)
 La Première Fois (1989)
 Terre de mes aïeux (1990)
 Chantemé (1991)
 La Croûte (1992)
 Encore pas un roman (1992)
 C'est la sève qui compte (1992)
 Des couilles (1992)

Honours and awards

 1991 : Finalist, Governor General's Awards.

References

1951 births
Living people
People from Algiers
Algerian emigrants to Canada
20th-century Canadian novelists
20th-century Canadian short story writers
Canadian women novelists
Canadian women short story writers
Canadian voice actresses
20th-century Canadian women writers